The CILEX (Chartered Institute of Legal Executives) is the professional body for over 20,000 paralegals, CILEX Lawyers and other legal professionals in England and Wales. It provides a cost-effective vocational route to qualification via the CILEX Professional Qualification (CPQ). the CPQ opens a route of entry for anyone who is looking to have a successful legal profession, whether they have a degree or equivalent qualification/experience or not.

History
The original name of Institute of Legal Executives (ILEX) was established in 1963 with the help of the Law Society of England and Wales to provide a more formal process for training so-called "solicitors' clerks". Prior to that the Institute had various incarnations dating back to 1892. Charles Dickens was a solicitor's clerk (he drew on his experience for characters in his novels, and a solicitor's managing clerk is featured in John Galsworthy's 1910 play Justice).

Traditionally, solicitors' clerks were not formally trained in law, but through experience had built up a working knowledge of specific aspects and could carry out legal paperwork as a fee earner. The creation of the Institute of Legal Executives meant that solicitors' clerks became qualified "legal executives" (holding a practising certificate and having a similar role to solicitors in practicing law). Legal Executive Lawyers gained rights that allow them to become partners in law firms, advocates with rights of audience in Court and judges.

Royal Charter Status
On 13 October 2011 the Institute of Legal Executives (as a company limited by guarantee) sought royal charter status''' from Her Majesty Queen Elizabeth II via the Privy Council.

A royal charter was granted on 30 January 2012 and the Institute of Legal Executives became the Chartered Institute of Legal Executives, otherwise known as CILEX.

Purpose
CILEX's purpose is to develop, support and inspire a highly skilled body of legal professionals and make the UK legal sector more efficient, more representative and better able to serve society. This is done by: 
 Delivering high quality qualifications which combine technical expertise with practical insight and emotional intelligence  
 Celebrating difference  
 Challenging outdated perceptions  
 Providing opportunities without barriers

Legal Qualifications
The official legal education that CILEX provides as a route into the legal profession is the CILEX Professional Qualification (CPQ). It is designed to produce CILEX Lawyers, CILEX Advanced Paralegal and CILEX Paralegal, and equip them with the skills they need to meet the changing demands of the modern legal market.

Split into three stages (Foundation, Advanced and Professional) and a total of 22 assessed modules across board, the CPQ is a tailored and flexible qualification pathway to the legal profession. It marries legal knowledge with the skills, behaviours and commercial awareness needed to perform in today's legal world.

Membership
CILEX has more than 20,000 members, all eligible to use the appropriate designator letters depending on their membership grade and demonstrating their commitment to professional and ethical standards in the legal profession.

Continuing Professional Development
The CILEX Continuing Professional Development (CPD) is created to ensure that all CILEX-qualified professionals maintain and extend their knowledge and skills whilst improving their professional role and career. This is to continue following their professional and legal duties, plus their compliance required by CILEX Regulation.

References

External links
 CILEX website

Legal organisations based in England and Wales
Organisations based in Bedford
Solicitors